Džemail Koničanin Džemo (1910—1944) was an Albanian military commander of the detachment of Sandžak Muslim militia established in Tutin during the Second World War.

In October 1941, frequent clashes happen between Chetniks and Albanian and Muslim militias. Koničanin's group repelleds Chetnik attack on village of Požega near Novi Pazar.  In November Koničanin participated in battle against Chetniks who tried to capture Novi Pazar. Together with forces of Mulla Jakup and Bilall Dreshaj, his forces attacked rear flanks of Chetniks and caused their dismay and retreat. Based on the Hadžiahmetovićs instructions he went to Sjenica to gather additional support in men, arms and ammunition for planned attack on Raška.

In December 1941, based on invitation of Hasan Zvizdić, Koničanin brought a company of Muslims from Tutin to Sjenica to participate in the struggle against Partisans who tried to capture Sjenica. Koničanin's men defeat one(of 3) column of Sjenica Partisan Company, who they either captured or executed. Because of his military achievements during Battles of Novi Pazar and Sjenica, local population nicknamed him 'Gazija'.

One of Koničanin's important roles was his cooperation with SS Polizei-Selbstschutz-Regiment Sandschak.

Koničanin commanded Muslim forces that burned village Šavci near Novi Pazar.

Koničanin was killed during an attack against Partisans on 23 June 1944.

References

Sources 
 
 

Sandžak Muslim militia
1910 births
1944 deaths
Albanian collaborators with Fascist Italy
Albanian collaborators with Nazi Germany
Executed Albanian collaborators with Nazi Germany
Military personnel killed in World War II